The Battle of Chalcedon may refer to:

 Battle of Chalcedon (74 BC), a naval battle of the Third Mithradatic War
 Battle of Chrysopolis in 324 AD, in which Constantine I defeated his rival Licinius to become sole emperor of Rome